Adam Froman (born December 18, 1987) is a former American football quarterback who played one season with the Spokane Shock of the Arena Football League (AFL). He first enrolled at Santa Rosa Junior College before transferring to the University of Louisville. Froman was also a member of the Atlanta Falcons and Winnipeg Blue Bombers.

Early years
Froman played high school football at Maria Carrillo High School in Santa Rosa, California. He threw for 1,944 yards as a senior and also recorded 20 touchdown passes.

College career
Froman first played college football for the Santa Rosa Bear Cubs of Santa Rosa Junior College. He helped the Bear Cubs to an 8-3 season in 2008, including a 28-20 win over No. 2-ranked Sierra College in the West Bank Bowl. He threw for 525 yards on 35 of 61 passing with three touchdowns in a win over Sierra and was named the game's Most Valuable Player. Froman tied the school record with seven touchdown passes in his third college start. He threw for a state-leading 3,876 yards and 40 touchdowns passes and was the NorCal Conference Offensive Player of the Year in 2008.

He later transferred to play for the Louisville Cardinals from 2009 to 2010. Froman recorded 17 touchdowns on 2,987 yards in 17 career games for the Cardinals.

Louisville statistics

Source:

Professional career
Froman was rated the 13th best quarterback in the 2011 NFL Draft by NFLDraftScout.com. The website also predicted that he would be selected in the sixth or seventh round.

Atlanta Falcons
After going undrafted, Froman signed with the Atlanta Falcons of the National Football League (NFL) on July 27, 2011. He was released by the Falcons on September 1, 2011.

Winnipeg Blue Bombers
On September 27, 2011, the Winnipeg Blue Bombers of the Canadian Football League signed Froman to the team's practice squad. He was released by the Blue Bombers on October 11, 2011.

Spokane Shock
Froman signed with the Spokane Shock of the AFL on November 2, 2011. He received playing time after starter Erik Meyer suffered an injury in the Shock's home opener. He recorded eight touchdowns on 459 passing yards for the Shock in 2012. Froman was released by the Shock on May 7, 2012.

Statistics

Stats from ArenaFan:

Coaching career
Froman served as an offensive assistant for the LSU Tigers from 2012 to 2013. He served as quarterback coach of the Valdosta State Blazers from 2013 to 2014.

After football
Froman (The Football King of Louisville) can be heard on the Louisville airways on ESPN Radio 93.9 The Ville. He is a regular guest on The Deener Show w/Drew Deener Wednesdays from 7:00 am – 10:00 am.

References

External links
Just Sports Stats
College stats

Living people
1987 births
Players of American football from California
American football quarterbacks
Canadian football quarterbacks
American players of Canadian football
Louisville Cardinals football players
Atlanta Falcons players
Winnipeg Blue Bombers players
Spokane Shock players
LSU Tigers football coaches
Valdosta State Blazers football coaches
Sportspeople from Santa Rosa, California
Santa Rosa Bear Cubs football players